Nesiodostomia is a genus of sea snails, marine gastropod mollusks in the family Pyramidellidae, the pyrams and their allies.

Species
Species within the genus Nesiodostomia include:
 Nesiodostomia montforti Corgan, 1972
 Nesiodostomia quarta (Pilsbry, 1918)
 Nesiodostomia tertia (Pilsbry, 1918)

The following species were brought into synonymy:
 Nesiodostomia quinta (Pilsbry, 1944) accepted as Nesiodostomia tertia (Pilsbry, 1918)

References

External links
 To World Register of Marine Species

Pyramidellidae
Monotypic gastropod genera